Bjarne Sørensen (born 23 December 1954) is a Danish former cyclist. He competed at the 1976 Summer Olympics and the 1980 Summer Olympics.

References

External links
 

1954 births
Living people
People from Rudersdal Municipality
Danish male cyclists
Olympic cyclists of Denmark
Cyclists at the 1976 Summer Olympics
Cyclists at the 1980 Summer Olympics
Cyclists from Copenhagen